Sword Stained with Royal Blood is a 2007 Chinese television series adapted from Louis Cha's novel of the same title. The series was first broadcast on CTV in Taiwan in 2007.

Cast
 Bobby Dou as Yuan Chengzhi
 Eva Huang as Xia Qingqing
 Sun Feifei as A'jiu / Princess Changping
 Hsiao Shu-shen as He Tieshou
 Ma Su as An Xiaohui
 Guo Jin as He Hongyao
 Gao Hu as Chongzhen Emperor
 Vincent Chiao as Xia Xueyi
 Cheng Haofeng as Li Yan
 Wang Weiguo as Li Zicheng
 He Qing as Wen Yi
 Yu Chenghui as Mu Renqing
 Han Xiao as Sun Zhongjun
 Su Mao as Sun Zhongtao
 Tian Zhong as Cui Ximin
 Yang Niansheng as Cheng Qingzhu
 Zhang Hengping as Wen Fangwu
 Li Ming as Hui Guinan
 Wang Wensheng as Liu Zongmin
 Wu Ting as Jiao Wan'er
 Wu Ma as Wen Fangda
 Li Chengru as Hong Taiji
 Ba Yin as Dorgon
 Zhang Yakun as Mei Jianhe
 Zhang Jizhong as Meng Bofei
 Zhao Yi as An Jianqing
 Liu Naiyi as Yuzhenzi
 Xu Baihui as Red Maiden
 Zhou Xiaobin as Hong Shenghai
 Li Dongguo as Min Zihua
 Wang Xiaoming

External links
  Sword Stained with Royal Blood on Sina.com
  Sword Stained with Royal Blood page on CTV website

Works based on Sword Stained with Royal Blood
Chinese wuxia television series
Television series set in the Ming dynasty
2007 Chinese television series debuts
2007 Chinese television series endings
Mandarin-language television shows
Television shows based on works by Jin Yong
Television series set in the 17th century